Jupiter Sajitarius is a 2004 album by Canadian-American alternative hip hop artist Noah23. It possesses "a remarkable variety of both production and compositions," according to MiC Music Portal. The majority of the album's production was handled by Orphan, and marked the final collaboration between the two, prior to Orphan's departure from Plague Language and the formation of Blue Sky Black Death.

The track "Chicken Pox" was released as a 10" single in 2004, featuring a remix entitled "Chicken Soup", produced by Orphan with a guest appearance from Ceschi, and a B-side entitled "Sigma Octantis", produced by Savillion. "Chicken Soup" was later included on the 2007 compilation Cameo Therapy, while "Sigma Octantis" appeared on 2008's Upside Down Bluejay.

Track listing

"Chicken Pox" 10" track listing

See also
2004 in hip hop music

References

External links
Jupiter Sajitarius on Bandcamp

2004 albums
Noah23 albums